John Mulvihill (born 1966) is an Australian professional rugby union football coach. He was previously head coach at the Cardiff Blues and assistant coach at Honda Heat and Western Force.

References

Living people
Australian rugby union coaches
Cardiff Rugby coaches
1966 births